NK Slavija may refer to:

NK Slavija Pleternica, football club from Pleternica, Croatia
NK Slavija Vevče, football club from Ljubljana, Slovenia